Kelton was a station on the Port Authority of Allegheny County's light rail network, located in Dormont, Pennsylvania. The street level stop was located in a densely populated residential area. It served commuters within walking distance, providing access toward Downtown Pittsburgh, South Hills Village, or Library. The busy commercial corridor along West Liberty Avenue was also accessible, located two blocks from the station.

Kelton was one of eleven stops closed on June 25, 2012 as part of a system-wide consolidation effort.

References

External links 

Port Authority T Stations Listings

Former Port Authority of Allegheny County stations
Railway stations in the United States opened in 1987
Railway stations closed in 2012